The Emergency Management Assistance Compact (EMAC) is a mutual aid agreement among states and territories of the United States. It enables states to share resources during natural and man-made disasters, including terrorism.

EMAC complements the national disaster response system. EMAC is used alongside federal assistance or when federal assistance is not warranted. EMAC facilitates the maximum use of all available resources within member states' inventories.

How it works
Under EMAC, requests and deployment of resources are made at the discretion of the affected state. At all times, affected states retain the choice of seeking resource support from states, the federal government, or both as may be determined by the size of the disaster event. The main contact for agencies, organizations, and the private sector to learn more about EMAC is the state emergency management agencies.

EMAC works as follows: When a disaster occurs, the governor of the affected state or territory declares a state of emergency. The impacted state assesses its resource needs and identifies shortfalls for which assistance will be requested, and authorized representatives from the affected state then activate EMAC. These authorized representatives as well as EMAC Advance Team (A-Team) members then determine the state's needs for personnel and equipment and broadcasts an EMAC requisition to other states. States with available resources negotiate costs with the affected state through the EMAC network, executing EMAC Form Req-A. Assisting states that commit to an agreement then mobilize and deploy the agreed-upon resources (personnel or equipment) to the affected state. Once the mission is completed, the resources are demobilized and redeployed to their home states. Deployed personnel provide receipts and records to their home state to develop a reimbursement package, which is then sent to the affected state, which then reimburses the assisting state.

EMAC is administered by the National Emergency Management Association (NEMA), which provides the day-to-day support and technical backbone for EMAC education and operations at its headquarters in Lexington, Kentucky.

History
EMAC was proposed by former Florida Governor Lawton Chiles after 1992's Hurricane Andrew. It was formed in 1993, and in 1995 any state was allowed to join and the National Emergency Management Association was made the administrator. Following the 1996 consent of the 104th U.S. Congress to EMAC (PL-104-321), which is required by the Compact Clause of the U.S. Constitution for any compact between states, EMAC has grown to become a nationwide system for providing mutual aid. To be a member of EMAC, each state or territory legislature must have passed legislation which was signed into law, adopting the standard language of the Compact. Since at least 2003, all U.S. states, the District of Columbia, U.S. Virgin Islands, Puerto Rico, and Guam are members of EMAC.

In 2004, EMAC was utilized during the response to Hurricanes Charley, Frances, Ivan, and Jeanne.  Through EMAC, more than 800 state and local personnel from 38 states (including California, which was not an EMAC member at that time) were deployed to Florida, Alabama, and West Virginia. The cost was approximately $15 million in personnel, equipment, and National Guard expenditures.

In 2005, EMAC was activated ten times in response to one wildfire, one flood, one tropical storm, two winter storms, and five hurricanes. Most striking, more than 65,000 personnel from 48 states, the District of Columbia, Puerto Rico, and the U.S. Virgin Islands were deployed under EMAC through the state emergency management agencies in response to Hurricanes Katrina and Rita. Total costs for the 2005 EMAC events are expected to exceed $840 million.

Benefits

In addition to providing another avenue for states to receive assistance in times of disaster, EMAC offers the following benefits:

 Assistance may be more readily available. EMAC allows states to ask for whatever assistance they need for any type of emergency—from earthquakes to acts of terrorism. EMAC's simple procedures help states dispense with bureaucratic wrangling.
 Legislation solves the problems of liability and responsibilities of cost. Once the conditions for providing assistance to a requesting state have been set, the terms constitute a legally binding contractual agreement that makes affected states responsible for reimbursement. Responding states can rest assured that sending aid will not be a financial or legal burden, and personnel who are deployed are protected under workers compensation and liability provisions.
 Legislation allows for credentials to be honored across state lines.

References

External links

United States interstate compacts
Emergency management in the United States
Emergency services in the United States
1996 establishments in the United States
State law in the United States
District of Columbia law

Guamanian law

Government of the United States Virgin Islands

Emergency management in Puerto Rico
Organizations based in Lexington, Kentucky
104th United States Congress